Peers is a hamlet in west-central Alberta, Canada within Yellowhead County. January Creek, a tributary of the McLeod River flows directly adjacent to the hamlet. Peers is also home to the annual Peers Gold Dust Daze, which takes place ~3 miles away from Peers

Statistics Canada recognizes Peers as a designated place.

Demographics 

See also 
List of communities in Alberta
List of designated places in Alberta
List of hamlets in Alberta

References 

Designated places in Alberta
Hamlets in Alberta
Yellowhead County